Pennsylvania Route 89 (PA 89) is a  north–south state highway located in northwestern Pennsylvania. The southern terminus of the route is at PA 8 and PA 27 in Titusville. The northern terminus is at PA 5 north of North East.

Route description

PA 89 begins running north on Franklin Street in the city of Titusville just after the PA 8/PA 27 junction. PA 89 runs northeast out of the city before arcing back around to the north and passing through the community of Vrooman. The highway then bypasses Rome and Buells Corners to the east and then continues north through Hatchtown. West of the borough of Spartansburg, PA 89 forms a brief concurrency with PA 77. PA 89 then crosses over into Erie County.

PA 89 continues north to US 6, which it overlaps with from Lovell to the borough of Elgin. After splitting off to the north once again, the highway turns more northwest and meets Pennsylvania Route 8 south of the borough of Wattsburg. The two routes overlap through Wattsburg (where they meet the western terminus of PA 474) and split up in Lowville. At Colt Station, PA 89 crosses PA 430. North of the PA 430 junction, PA 89 has an interchange with Interstate 86 (exit 3).  later, PA 89 has an interchange with Interstate 90 (exit 41). PA 89 then enters the borough of North East. There, it serves as the western terminus of PA 426 before crossing US 20. PA 89 then comes to an end at PA 5, near Lake Erie.

History
PA 89 was established in 1928. In 1930, the highway ran from U.S. Route 6 in Beaver Dam to U.S. Route 20 in North East. By 1941, PA 89 was extended south to the current southern terminus at Titusville. The northern terminus was also extended to Pennsylvania Route 5 in North East.

Major intersections

See also

References

External links

Pennsylvania Highways: PA 89

089
Transportation in Crawford County, Pennsylvania
Transportation in Erie County, Pennsylvania